Suis La Lune were a Swedish screamo band from Stockholm and Gothenburg, Sweden.

History

Early years and Quiet, Pull The Strings! (2005–2006) 
Suis La Lune formed in February 2005. The band released a 4-song demo a few months later and performed their first live shows. A self-titled 7-inch record was released in November on UK-based label Leaves Records. Later that month the band went on to play their first international shows on a tour in the UK. The band returned to the studio in early 2006 to record their first full-length album. The record titled Quiet, Pull The Strings! was released in the fall of 2006 through Ape Must Not Kill Ape Records. The band played on tour in Germany, Belgium and The Netherlands in support of the album.

Becoming a four-piece band, Heir and US-tours (2007–2010) 
In July 2007 the band parted ways with guitarist and backup vocalist Robert Svensson, with Henning Runolf taking on guitar duties while keeping his role as the main vocalist. Later that year they again went on tour in Europe. In 2008, Suis La Lune released a 10-inch EP record titled Heir. Through Myspace, the band came in contact with members of Baltimore hardcore act Osceola and got booked for a two-week East Coast tour. They toured the first leg of the tour with Osceola, and the second with Army of Kashyyyk, also hailing from Baltimore. A split 7-inch record with Suis La Lune and Osceola was released concurrently with their tour on independent record label Protagonist Music.

Suis La Lune went back to the US in 2010, this time on a tour that spanned 32 days and which covered the East Coast and some of the Midwest. They primarily toured with Baltimore hardcore and DIY-bands Pala, Fair Root and Heaviness Of The Load. A tour 7-inch record was released in support of the tour through Protagonist Music and Fasaden Records.

Touring Europe, Riala and hiatus (2011–2012) 
In April 2011, Suis La Lune went on tour in Europe and the UK with American post-hardcore band Pianos Become the Teeth. For the remainder of the year, Suis La Lune wrote, rehearsed and pre-produced their forthcoming full-length album.

In January 2012, Suis La Lune started recording their sophomore full-length album and announced it would be released by Topshelf Records. The album, titled Riala, was released in May of that year, after which the band embarked on a summer tour that included the UK, Europe and Russia.

In September 2012, Suis La Lune announced they would go on a temporary break. During the hiatus, band members focused on side projects like Sore Eyelids and Trembling Hands.

Instrument swap and Distance/Closure (2014–2015) 

In January 2014 the band communicated they were active again. No changes had been made to the line-up with the exception of Karl and Daniel switching instruments. According to the band the change was made in referral to Daniel's wrist health. In November 2014 the band announced that they would release a new record on Topshelf Records, and on 31 July 2015, the 12-inch EP Distance/Closure was released. Throughout 2015, Suis La Lune supported Ampere, Loma Prieta and Pianos Become the Teeth when the aforementioned bands performed in Sweden.

International touring, split release with Shirokuma and disbanding (2016–2018) 

In May 2016 Suis La Lune went on tour with Italian band Pastel in Italy and Austria. Later during the year, they released a split 12-inch record with the Swedish band Shirokuma via Dog Knights Productions. In 2017 Suis La Lune traveled to Japan to play two shows in Tokyo. A compilation CD titled The First Five Years was released on Japanese record label Tokyo Jupiter Records in support of the shows.

On August 12, 2018, the band announced they had broken up via social media. In the same week, Dan Ozzi of Noisey included the band in an article covering the reach of screamo music outside of the US in which he described the band as "a powerhouse of the Swedish scene." When reporting the breakup, alternative music and media publication The New Fury described the band as "one of the most acclaimed screamo/post-hardcore bands in the music scene". Writing for Punktastic, reviewer Glen Bushell named Suis La Lune "masters of their own unique art". While listing 25 essential screamo albums online magazine BrooklynVegan hailed Suis La Lune, among other bands, as "incredible".

Discography

Studio albums

Extended plays

Singles

Split releases

Demos

Compilation albums

Compilation appearances

Band members

Members
Henning Runolf - vocals (2005–2018) & guitars (2007–2018)
Andreas Olerås - bass & backing vocals (2005–2018)
Daniel Pettersson - guitars & backing vocals (2014–2018), drums (2005–2014)
Karl Sladö - drums (2014–2018), guitars & backing vocals (2005–2014)

2014 instrument switch

Prior to 2014, Daniel played drums and Karl played guitar. Due to wrist health problems, Daniel switched instruments with Karl as of 2014 and onwards.

Former members
Robert Svensson - guitars & backing vocals (2005–2007)

Timeline

References

Screamo musical groups
Emo musical groups
Musical groups from Gothenburg
Musical groups from Stockholm
Musical groups established in 2005
2005 establishments in Sweden
Topshelf Records artists
Swedish hardcore punk groups